Amanda del Llano (1920–1964) was a Mexican film actress and singer. For the RCA Víctor label, she recorded songs such as "A grito abierto", "Aquella", "Cuando salga la luna", "Cu cu rru cu cú paloma", "Échame a mí la culpa", "Estrellita marinera", "La noche de mi mal", "Una noche serena y oscura" and "Y ya".

Selected filmography

 The Unknown Policeman (1941)
 The Eternal Secret (1942)
 The Black Angel (1942)
 Champion Without a Crown (1946)
 The Noiseless Dead (1946)
 Spurs of Gold (1948)
 Bluebeard (1955)

References

Bibliography
 Rogelio Agrasánchez. Guillermo Calles: A Biography of the Actor and Mexican Cinema Pioneer. McFarland, 2010.

External links

1920 births
1964 deaths
Mexican film actresses
Actresses from Chiapas
20th-century Mexican actresses
Ranchera singers
20th-century Mexican women singers